Royal Society Open Science is a peer-reviewed open access scientific journal published by the Royal Society since September 2014. Its launch was announced in February 2014.
It covers all scientific fields and publishes all articles which are scientifically sound, leaving any judgement of impact to the reader. As of 2022, the editor-in-chief, Dame Wendy Hall DBE FRS FREng FCGI, is supported by a team of Subject Editors and Associate Editors. Commissioning and peer review for the chemistry section of the journal is managed by the Royal Society of Chemistry. The journal offers Registered Reports across all subject disciplines, and Replications as a formal article type in the Psychology and Cognitive Neuroscience Section (as of 2019), though the journal welcomes replications in other disciplines, too. In 2021, the journal launched a new 'Science, Society and Policy' section of the journal. 

Articles published in Royal Society Open Science are regularly covered in the mainstream media, such as BBC News and The Independent.

The journal is indexed by a number of services, including PubMed, PubMed Central, Scopus, the Directory of Open Access Journals and the Astrophysics Data System.

After an article is accepted, authors must pay an article processing charge to see the article published.  The fee, as of January 2021, is GBP 1200, or USD 1680, or EUR 1440. The journal offers a number of article processing charge waivers.

References

Royal Society academic journals
Open access journals
Multidisciplinary scientific journals
English-language journals
Publications established in 2014
Continuous journals
2014 establishments in the United Kingdom